The 2022 Arachas Super 50 Cup was the 50 over section of the eighth Women's Super Series competition, that took place in Ireland. The tournament ran from May to August 2022, alongside the Twenty20 Arachas Super 20 Trophy. Three teams competed in a double round-robin group stage: Dragons, Scorchers and Typhoons. The tournament was won by Scorchers.

Competition format
The three sides played each other side twice in 50 over matches between May and August. The tournament worked on a league system.

The league worked on a points system with positions being based on the total points. Points were awarded as follows:

Win: 2 points. 
Tie: 1 point. 
Loss: 0 points.
Abandoned/No Result: 1 point.

Squads

Source: Cricket Ireland

Points table

Source: CricketArchive

Fixtures
Source: Cricket Ireland

References

Women's Super Series
2022 in Irish cricket